Antonio J. Flores Flores  (born 7 March 1972) is a Spanish football manager who serves as a technical director at Hogar hispano valencia fc of the liga estadal venezuela.

Playing career
He played for La Mojonera FC in youth stage as well featured for the senior team of La Mojonera in 1989–1994.

Managerial career
He has worked in the FIFA competition such as Uganda Super League, Lesotho Premier League, Futve Liga Venezuela, National First Division in South Africa. He managed clubs in Spain (youth), (2 andaluza), Villa SC, Nyamityobora fc in Uganda, Sandawana FC, Lioli FC both in Lesotho and lately Super Eagles FC in South Africa National First Division, and Yaracuyanos FC in Venezuela.

Villa SC
On 13 July 2015 was unveiled as the head coach of Villa SC by Villa SC boss Ben Misagga and penned a two-year contract but in November 2015 he parted ways with Villa SC and was linked to Gor Mahia FC but the deal failed on the eleventh hour.

Sarl Star Football Algérie (U-17)
In September 2016 he was signed as the coach for the U-17  to develop players for La Masia in Algeria.

Sandawana FC
In January 2017 he was a head coach in Lesotho Premier League club Sandawana FC and agreed a one-year deal with the club management. He worked with American coach Eric Sarno as his assistant. In his first match, he registered a 2–1 win over Linare FC on 12 February at Maputsoe DiFA Stadium. He saved it from the relegation successfully and in June 2017 he parted ways from it.

Lioli FC
In July 2017 he was appointed as the technical director coach for Lioli FC  where he guided them through 23 games and making the best record of winning with 78%. In November 2017 he left the club leading the table of the Lesotho Premier League to join National First Division club in South Africa.

Super Eagles FC
In November 2017, he was appointed as the head coach in the National First Division Super Eagles Football club  in South Africa replacing Tshegofatso Mashego, who was demoted following a poor start to the season that saw the team winning just two of their first 10 league matches. He guided them through 17 games where won 2 games of Nedbank Cup  games, winning to Black Leopards 3-0 and losing in extra time 2–1 against Free State Stars. In March 2018, he parted ways amicably.

Nyamityobora FC
He signed a contract on 28 August 2018 as the technical director at Nyamityobora FC.

CD Roquetas (U-17)
He signed contract as head coach with CD Roquetas (U-17) on 7 March 2019 till 30 June 2019.

CD Dofer Dalias
On 13 July 2019 he signed as head coach for the Spanish club CD Dofer Dalias.

Yaracuyanos F.C.
In March 2020, Flores was appointed as the technical director for Yaracuyanos F.C. in Venezuela Premier League.

Personal life
Flores is a UEFA Pro Licence Coaching license holder. He holds a Spanish level 3 coaching football license, CAF B License. He speaks English, Spanish, German and Russian. Flores is a cousin to former Watford and now Espanyol manager Quique Sánchez Flores.

References

External links

 Antonio Flores Interview

1972 births
Living people
Spanish footballers
Spanish football managers
Expatriate football managers in Uganda
Expatriate football managers in Lesotho
Expatriate football managers in Algeria
Association football midfielders
People from Bendorf
Footballers from Rhineland-Palatinate
Spanish expatriate sportspeople in Uganda
Spanish expatriate sportspeople in Lesotho
Spanish expatriate sportspeople in Algeria